Tobgyal (born May 1958), also called Duobujie, is a Chinese actor of Tibetan descent, best known in film for portraying a tribal chief in Red River Valley (1997), Ri Tai in Kekexili: Mountain Patrol (2004), and Zhan Tiejun in No Man's Land (2013). He is a member of the China Theater Association and China Film and Television Association.

Early life and education
Tobgyal was born in Kardak Township, Cona County, Tibet Autonomous Region, China, in May 1958. In 1972, during the middle of the Cultural Revolution, his grandparents sent him to a propaganda team. As a youth, he had his first on stage experience by reciting Quotations from Chairman Mao Tse-tung in a theater in Tibet. Two years later, he returned home to be a farmer. In 1976, at the age of 18, he became a coal miner in Shigatse. At the end of that year, Tobgyal was elected as a trainee in the Tibet Autonomous Region Drama Troupe. He was sent to Shanghai Theatre Academy to study acting on government scholarships. On the graduation ceremony, he played as Romeo in Romeo and Juliet, a tragedy written by William Shakespeare early in his career about two young star-crossed lovers whose deaths ultimately reconcile their feuding families.

Acting career
Tobgyal made his film debut in Mysteries of the Potala Palace (1988), playing a Khenpo.

In 1995, he had key supporting role in Snow Tremor as Gonpo, which earned him an Outstanding Supporting Actor Award at the Flying Apsaras Awards.

Tobgyal earned critical acclaim for his performance as a tribal chief in Red River Valley (1996) by Feng Xiaoning, for which he received a Best Supporting Actor nomination at the Golden Rooster Awards.

Tobgyal has made a number of guest appearances on other television shows, including Tibet Situation, Princess Wencheng, Once Upon a Time in Lhasa, When All Is Said And Done, The Living Buddha, Tea-Horse Road, and Snow Territory Day Road.

In 2002, for his role as Luosang Danzeng in Flower of Happiness, he won a Best Actor Award at the Courser Award.

Tobgyal rose to fame after portraying Ri Tai in Lu Chuan's Kekexili: Mountain Patrol (2004), which garnered him Golden Horse Award, Chinese Film Media Award and Golden Rooster Award nominations for Best Actor.

In 2006, he was cast as Crowe Anglo in Prince of the Himalayas, directed by Hu Xuehua and starring Purba Rgyal.

In 2011, Tobgyal portrayed Feng Guozhang, a warlord in the Republic of China (1912-1949), in 1911. That same year, he appeared in Yu Rongguang's The Mu Saga, a historical television series starring Ray Lui, Choo Ja-hyun, Yu Rongguang and Pan Hong.

In 2014, Tobgyal landed a key supporting role on No Man's Land playing role of Zhan Tiejun opposite actors Xu Zheng, Yu Nan and Huang Bo. He received Chinese Film Media Award nomination for Best Supporting Actor.

In 2017, he starred in an epic film called The Chainbreakers with Lobsang Namdak, Wang Ziyi, Yang Xiucuo and Ngawang Rinchen. The film premiered at the Shanghai International Film Festival on June 21, 2017, and opened in China on December 8, 2017.

Filmography

Film

TV series

Film and TV Awards

References

External links

 Tobgyal Douban 
 Tpbgyal Mtime 

1958 births
People from Shigatse
Living people
Shanghai Theatre Academy alumni
21st-century Chinese male actors
Tibetan male actors
Chinese male film actors
Chinese male television actors